Paul O'Dea (born 1996) is an Irish hurler who plays for Dublin Senior Championship club Na Fianna and at inter-county level with the Dublin senior hurling team. He usually lines out at wing-back.

Career

A member of the Na Fianna club in Glasnevin, O'Dea first came to prominence on the inter-county scene with the Dublin minor team in 2014. He subsequently won a Leinster Under-21 Championship medal with the Dublin under-21 team, while simultaneously lining out with the DCU Dóchas Éireann in the Fitzgibbon Cup. O'Dea made his senior debut against Kilkenny during the 2021 National Hurling League.

Career statistics

Honours

Dublin
Leinster Under-21 Hurling Championship: 2016

References

External links
Paul O'Dea profile at the Dublin GAA website

1996 births
Living people
Na Fianna hurlers
Dublin inter-county hurlers